Sebastian Krimmer (born 21 June 1990 in Backnang) is a German gymnast. He competed for the national team at the 2012 Summer Olympics in the Men's artistic team all-around.

References

German male artistic gymnasts
1990 births
Living people
Olympic gymnasts of Germany
Gymnasts at the 2012 Summer Olympics
People from Backnang
Sportspeople from Stuttgart (region)
Medalists at the World Artistic Gymnastics Championships
European Games competitors for Germany
Gymnasts at the 2015 European Games